Starkovia hallidayi is a species of mite in the family Laelaptonyssidae, found in Australia.
 It was first described in 2000 by Gerald W. Krantz as Laelaptonyssus hallidayi.

References

Mesostigmata
Taxa described in 2000